The Presbyterian Church in Korea (HapDongBoSu) was founded within JengRip Presbyterian church. In 1984 become a separated denomination. Pastor Han Chun-Keun, Pastor Kim Kuk-In, Pastor Lee Sun-Sik together with 50 pastors founded the Presbyterian Church in Korea (HapDongJeongRip). In 1989 it adopted the current name. The Apostles Creed and the Westminster Confession the standards.
In 2004 it had 3,800 members and 74 congregations served by 64 pastors. It had 4 Presbyteries and a General assembly.

References 

Presbyterian denominations in South Korea
Presbyterian denominations in Asia